This list of books about skepticism is a skeptic's library of works centered on scientific skepticism, religious skepticism, critical thinking, scientific literacy, and refutation of claims of the paranormal. It also includes titles about atheism, irreligion, books for "young skeptics" and related subjects. It is intended as a starting point for research into these areas of study.

Collections in the realm of skepticism, science literacy, and freethought exist both online and in brick-and-mortar libraries. The complete works of Robert G. Ingersoll are available online at both the Secular Web and as part of the Internet Archive project The Drew University Library hosts a collection of pamphlets by and about Mr. Ingersoll.  In 2013 the Library of Congress announced the opening of the Seth MacFarlane Collection of the Carl Sagan and Ann Druyan Archive which includes more than 1,500 boxes of donated material. MacFarlane donated the funds which allowed the Library of Congress to purchase a collection of Sagan's notes from Druyan (widow of Sagan) because of his concern over fading science literacy.

Books 
To sort the table, click the arrow in any header cell.

See also 

 List of books about philosophy
 List of science books on evolution
 List of skeptical magazines
 List of skeptical podcasts
 Lists about skepticism

References

External links 
 The Skeptics Society: The Reading Room
 Goodreads: A Skeptic's Library
 Committee for Skeptical Inquiry: Skeptical Books for Children and Young Adults
 
 

 
Books
Books
Skepticism